Dynein axonemal heavy chain 5 is a protein that in humans is encoded by the DNAH5 gene.

DNAH5 is a protein-coding gene.1 It provides the instructions for synthesizing a protein that belongs to a microtubule-associated protein complex made of heavy, light and intermediate chains.2 DNAH5 is responsible for making the heavy chain 5, found within the outer dynein arms of cilia.1 It will function as a force generating protein by using ATP, producing the power stroke for cilia.3

During early development, the cilia found on the primitive node will beat in a directional pattern, sending signaling molecules to the left, this process will begin to establish the internal left-right asymmetry.3
Mutations in DNAH5 are linked to primary ciliary dyskinesia, an autosomal recessive disorder.4 This X-linked disorder is characterized by recurrent respiratory infections, infertility, and abnormal organ placement.1 Non-functional DNAH5 proteins have been identified in individuals with primary ciliary dyskinesia and randomized left-right asymmetry.4

References

External links
  GeneReviews/NIH/NCBI/UW entry on Primary Ciliary Dyskinesia

Further reading